The 2020–21 season (officially known as Liga de Plata and also as Torneo Luis Baltazar Ramírez) will be El Salvador's Segunda División de Fútbol Salvadoreño. The season will be split into two championships Apertura 2020 and Clausura 2021. The champions of the Apertura and Clausura play the direct promotion playoff every year. The winner of that series ascends to Primera División de Fútbol de El Salvador.

Changes to the 2020–21 seasons
Due to the Pandemic, several teams opted out to participate this season, with only 14 teams available to compete

Teams promoted to 2020–21 Primera División de El Salvador
 No teams promoted

Teams relegated to Segunda División de Fútbol Salvadoreño  - Apertura 2019
 No teams relegated

Teams relegated to Tercera Division de Fútbol Salvadoreño - Apertura 2019 
 No teams relegated

Teams promoted from Tercera Division De Fútbol Profesional - Apertura 2019
 No teams promoted

New Teams or teams that purchased a spot in the Segunda division
 El Vencedor (Traded their spot with Atletico Marte) 
 A.D. Destroyer (Purchased spot of Brujos de Izalco)

Teams that failed to register for the Apertura 2020
 Atletico Marte (bought the spot of El Vencedor in the Primera division.
 Brujos de Izalco (sold their spot to AD Destroyer)
 Once Lobos (Opted to no Participate due to COVID-19 Pandemic)
 Racing Junior (Opted to no Participate due to COVID-19 Pandemic)
 Topilzin (Opted to no Participate due to COVID-19 Pandemic)
 El Vencedor  (Opted to no Participate due to COVID-19 Pandemic)
 Gerardo Barrios  (Opted to no Participate due to COVID-19 Pandemic)

Managerial changes

Apertura

Teams

Only 14 teams chose to Participate in this season Competition

Regular-season standings

Finals

Quarter-finals

First Leg

Second Leg

A.D. Destroyer won 4-3 on Aggregate.

Marte Soyapango tied 3-3 on Aggregate, won penalties

Platense won 1-0 on Aggregate.

Cacahuatique won 2-1 on Aggregate.

Semi-finals

First Leg

Second Leg

Platense won 3-2 on Aggregate.

AD Destroyer tied 4-4 on aggregate, won on penalties.

Final

Platense won 5-4 on Penalties.

Individual awards

Clausura

Teams

Only 14 teams chose to Participate in this season Competition

Regular-seasons

Group A

Group B

Finals

Quarter-finals

First Leg

Second Leg

A.D. Destroyer won 3-1 on Aggregate.

San Pablo won 3-1 on Aggregate.

2-2. Fuerte San Francisco won 7-6 on penalties.

Platense won 3-2 on Aggregate.

Semi-finals

First Leg

Second Leg

Platense won 2-1 on Aggregate.

AD Destroyer tied 3-1 won on aggregate.

Final

AD Destroyer won 5-4 on Penalties.

References

External links
 

Segunda División de Fútbol Salvadoreño seasons
2020–21 in Salvadoran football
EL Sal